Khariar (also called  Khadial, Rajkhariar and Rajakhariar) is a city and a Notified Area Council in Nuapada District of the Indian state of Odisha.

History
The foundation of the Patna kingdom was laid by Ramai Deva of the Chauhan dynasty in 1360 CE when he overthrew Hattahamir Deb, the administrator of the region as the Eastern Ganga Empire started weakening following invasions from the northern part of the subcontinent. The Chauhan reign eventually extends over the region under its cadet branches which include the kingdoms of Sambalpur State, Sonepur State and the zamindaries of Khariar and Jarasingha. The history of the Chauhan rule in the region is also obtained from the 16th century palm-leaf manuscript Kosalananda Kavya.

The region of Khariar was under the rule of the Chauhan dynasty of Patna State which was established by Ramai Deva of the Chauhan dynasty in the 14th cen CE who were vassals of the Eastern Ganga dynasty which was declining following invasions from the northern part of the Indian subcontinent. The Chauhan reign from Patnagarh continued over the region and later expanded through the establishment of their cadet branches extending their rule over areas of Western Odisha and eastern Chhattisgarh. In 1600 CE, Raja Gopal Rai who belonged to the Chauhan family of Balangir was crowned as the first king of Khariar. This led to the formation of the Khariar zamindari that remained until Indian independence in 1947.

The Patna-Sambalpur group was subsequently restored to Raghujee Bhonsla II in 1806. The Marhattas of Nagpur became subordinate to British power after the 3rd Anglo-Marhatta War in 1818.But Kalahandi continued to be under Marhatta rule till 1853, when the Nagpur state lapsed to the British Crown as Raghujee III died without an heir. The Chauhans were ruling over Khariar since about the time of Rama Deo, the first Chauhan king of Patna. In 1590 A.D. Gopal Ray, a scion of the Patna family became the king of Khariar and started a line of semi-independent kings in that territory. Khariar came under the Marhattas in 1741 A.D. and the British occupied it in 1818.In 1905 when the District of Sambalpur and some feudatory states including Kalahandi were amalgamated with Orissa Division of Bengal, the Government of the Central Provinces opposed merger of Khariar with Sambalpur and in 1906 Khariar became a part of the Mahasamund tahasil. When the separate province of Orissa was formed in 1936, Khariar was added to Orissa and was made a sub-division (Nuapada sub-division) of Sambalpur District. On the 1st January 1948, Kalahandi alongwith other feudatory states of Orissa except Mayurbhanj, merged with Orissa and on that date the new District of Kalahandi was formed with the ex-states of Kalahandi, Patna and Sonepur. On the 1st November 1949, Patna and Sonepur together constituted a separate District and the Nuapada sub-division of Sambalpur was added to the District of Kalahandi. After that, on 1 April 1993, Nuapada became a separate district carved out from the undivided kalahandi district. Then, Khariar comes under the district of Nuapada.

Economy

Nuapada district is located in western part of Odisha in India and Khariar is located in the heart of Nuapada district. Khariar is the one of the major towns in Nuapada district. It is the main business centre in the locality. It has a daily market and a weekly bazaar takes place every Friday.

Geography
It is located in the western part of Odisha, close to the border of Raipur District, Chhattisgarh. It comes under a rain shadow belt. It belongs to the Mahanadi basin the Eastern Ghats where mountains are interspersed with wide valleys. The climate is tropical with the rainfall is due to the South West monsoon.

Demographics

As of the 2011 Indian census, Khariar has a population of 15,087. Males constitute 51% of the population and females 49%. Khariar has an average literacy rate of 62%, higher than the national average of 59.5%. The male literacy is 72%, and female literacy is 52%. In Khariar, 13% of the population is under 6 years of age.

Odia is the official language of Khariar. Hindi is also spoken in Khariar. English is widely used for official purposes.

Transportation
Khariar is a major transportation hub in Nuapada District as people from the three blocks, namely Boden, Sinapali and Khariar, depend on the mode of transportation available in Khariar. Though Khariar is not connected by rail, it is well connected by roads. The major roads passing through Khariar are NH 353 (Khariar-Raipur), NH 59 (Khariar-Gopalpur), SH 16 (Khariar-Sambalpur), and SH 44 (Khariar-Bhawanipatna). The nearest rail head is Kantabanji, which is situated 35 km from Khariar. Another nearest railway station is Titlagarh (which is also the hottest place in India).

Khariar is connected by bus via the NH 353 & NH 59. The new railway line survey has been completed for Kantabanji to Jeypur via Khariar.

Nearby Towns/Village 

Boden, 28 km
Komna, 25 km
Sinapali, 30 km
Gandabahali, 21 km
Kantabanjhi, 35 km
Titlagarh, 50 km
Nuapada, 70 km
Balangir, 112 km
Bhawanipatna, 70 km
Raipur, 190 km
New Raipur, 140 km
Khariar Road, 78 km
Sambalpur, 240 km
Bhubaneswar, 430 km
Kolkata, 838 km
Brahampur, 338 km

Religious places

There are several religious places of different religions in Khariar; this indicates a diversity in religion, culture in Khariar. Some of the temples located in Khariar are:

 Maa Samaleswari Temple, near Azad Chowk
 Raktambari Mandir, near Azad Chowk
 Hanuman Mandir, near Azad Chowk
 Hanuman Mandir, Puruna Bustand
 Dadhibamana Mandir, Badgudipada
 Jagannath Temple
 Ram Mandir
 Hanuman Mandir, irrigation colony
 Koshaleswar Temple, irrigation colony
 Ganesh Mandir, irrigation colony
 Bhubaneswari Mandir, irrigation colony
 Shiva Temple, Duajhar
 Maa Santoshi Mandir, Junen
Radha Krishna Mandir, Junen
 Siva Mandir, Tirbandh
 Siva Mandir, Muktasagar
 Gayatri Mandir, Chalanpada
 Radhakrushna Madir, Damapala
 Shri Rameswara Siva Mandir, Bhaludungari
 Shiv Temple, Dalpada
Some of the other religious places of other communities are:
 Mukti Marg Church, Khariar
 Sunni Hanfi Jama Masjid, Khariar
 Sunni Jamat Eidgah, Khariar

Places of interest

Tourist destinations 
There are several tourist spots around Khariar, including:
 Patalganga: A tourist spot located approximately 30 km from Khariar which attracts pilgrims from different parts of Nuapada district as well as from neighbouring districts.
 Tikhali Dam: Officially known as the Lower Indra Irrigation Project, this dam is situated 17 km from Khariar.
 Rusi Pitha: Rusipitha (Risipiti) is located near Tukla.
 Jogimatha-Tukla
 Ramgarh Hill: The largest elephant stone is located at this place and it is considered to be the oldest elephant stone in the undivided kalahandi district. According to an ancient belief, Lord Ram brother Lakshman and wife sita had resided in the exile period.

Markets 

 Daily Market (Fresh Market)
 Goru/Sukrabar Bazar (Weekly)
 New Daily Market (Near Old Bus Stand)
 Machh Bazaar (Old Daily Market)
 New Machh/Mansh Bazaar (Boden Chowk-Gadramunda Area)

Culture

Khariar's culture is a blend of traditional festivals, food, dance etc. Khariar has a proud cultural heritage that arose due to intermingling of different religions. The major language used is Odia, which is widely used in each and every part of Khariar region. Nuakhai is the major festival celebrated in this region. The other festivals like Rathayatra, Dusshera, Holi, Diwali, Eid, Christmas, Chindaguda (Dhanujatra, Anchalika Sanskrutik Utsav) are also celebrated in Khariar. Khariar organises Khariar Mahotsav every year, which attracts a large number of people from different places.

The activities of this town include running of schools, shops or very small industries and bus communications. Other than these activities, political activities across the town are also common. In evenings, it is a common sight to see youth playing at various fields (mostly at Raja A.T. High School field, Vidya Mandir field, Bhojpur Field, College Field, and Shanti Nagar Field). Veterans also participate in several fitness activities during evenings, like jogging near Canal Road, Padampur Road, Tukla Road, Nehena Road, College Road, or Junen NH Road.

Notable persons

 Jitamitra Singh Deo, present Raja Saheb of Khariar. He is also a poet and historian
 Manish Bansal, founder of news portal Newstrend.news. In 2018, it was among the top 10 most popular websites of India with a position of number 10.
 Prayag Dutta Joshi, writer and activist
 Adhiraj Mohan Panigrahi, member of the Odisha Legislative Assembly of Khariar (Odisha Vidhan Sabha constituency).
 Kapil Narayan Tiwari (1929–2022), member of the Odisha Legislative Assembly
 Ujjwal Gupta Chairperson Notified Area Council - Khariar

References

 

Odisha
Nuapada district